was a Japanese politician who was Prime Minister of Japan from 1978 to 1980. Ōhira's time in office was cut short when he died in office; he remains the most recent Japanese Prime Minister to die in office.

Early life

Masayoshi Ōhira was born on 12 March 1910, in Wada, Kagawa Prefecture (present-day Kan'onji, Kagawa), the third son of farmer Toshiyoshi Ōhira and his wife Saku. His father was a representative of the village council and the irrigation union although he had not received any education. He had eight siblings (two elder brothers, three elder sisters, a younger brother and a younger sister) but the eldest of the sisters had died before her first birthday and one of his elder brothers had died at age two. Ōhira referred to himself as "the son of an impoverished farmer of Sanuki" but in reality his family was middle-class. But even then, the parents had a hard time supporting their six children, and Ōhira assisted their side job from a young age.

In 1926, when he was 16 years old, Ōhira contracted typhoid fever and nearly died. This near death experience contributed to his conversion to Christianity around that time.

In 1933, when he was 23, Ōhira won two scholarships and was able to belatedly attend university at the Tokyo University of Commerce (present-day Hitotsubashi University), where he studied economics. In 1936, he entered the Ministry of Finance where he became a protégé of Hayato Ikeda.

Ōhira worked in the Ministry of Finance throughout World War II. In the postwar period, when Ikeda became Minister of Finance from 1949 to 1952, Ōhira served as his private secretary.

Early political career
In 1952, at Ikeda's urging, Ōhira ran for and won the first of 10 terms in the House of Representatives of the Japanese National Diet, first representing the Liberal Party, and later its successor party the Liberal Democratic Party (LDP).

In 1957, as Ikeda prepared a push to try to become prime minister, Ōhira became a founding member of Ikeda's "Kōchikai" think tank, and was widely viewed as Ikeda's "right-hand man". He helped Ikeda write speeches and election manifestos.

Ikeda became prime minister in 1960, when Nobusuke Kishi resigned following the disastrous 1960 Anpo Protests. As a trained economist and trusted member of Ikeda's "brain trust", Ōhira helped design and implement Ikeda's famed Income Doubling Plan, which helped turn the attention of the Japanese people away from contentious political struggles to a nationwide drive for economic growth.

From 1962–1964, Ōhira served as Ikeda's Foreign Minister. In this role, he conducted the delicate negotiations which paved the way for Japan's normalization of relations with South Korea in 1965. When Ikeda died in 1964, Ōhira inherited control of his faction.

LDP power broker and prime minister

At the apex of his political life, Ōhira came to represent what were known as the "mainstream factions" within the Liberal Democratic Party (LDP), which put him at odds with Prime Minister Takeo Fukuda, who led what were known as the "anti-mainstream" factions. From 1968 to 1970, Ōhira served as Minister of International Trade and Industry under Ikeda's successor Eisaku Satō. In 1972, Ōhira unsuccessfully competed for the party leadership before throwing his support to ultimate winner Kakuei Tanaka. Ōhira was then rewarded for his support with a post as Tanaka's first Foreign Minister, which he held until mid-July 1974. In a cabinet reshuffle in July 1974, he was replaced by Toshio Kimura as Foreign Minister but then immediately appointed Finance Minister, replacing Takeo Fukuda.

Ōhira was elected to the presidency of the LDP in late 1978. On 7 December 1978, he was appointed 68th Prime Minister, successfully pushing longtime rival Takeo Fukuda from his position.

Ōhira was the sixth Christian to hold this office after Hara Takashi, Takahashi Korekiyo, Ichirō Hatoyama, Tetsu Katayama, and Shigeru Yoshida.

In the general election of 1979, the LDP narrowly failed to win an outright majority, but enough independent members of the Diet joined the party to enable Ōhira to remain in office, and he was duly reappointed on 9 November of that year. On 16 May 1980, a vote of no confidence was held in the Diet.

Ōhira expected the motion to fail, and was visibly shaken when it passed 243–187. 69 members of his own LDP, including Fukuda, abstained. Given the choice of resigning or calling new elections, Ōhira chose the latter and began campaigning for LDP candidates. He was hospitalized for exhaustion on 31 May and died of a massive heart attack 12 days later.

Chief Cabinet Secretary Masayoshi Ito acted in Ōhira's place as deputy after his death. Yoshio Sakurauchi, the Secretary General of LDP, led the LDP to its greatest victory in fifteen years, capitalizing on the "sympathy vote" generated by Ōhira's death. Zenkō Suzuki became Ōhira's successor as prime minister following the election.

Personal life

Religion
Ōhira converted to Christianity during his time at the Takamatsu Higher School of Commerce (now the Takamatsu College of Economics), though without becoming a member of any formal Christian denomination. However, others have stated that he was a member of the Anglican Church in Japan during the 1970s.

Honours
Grand Cordon of the Order of the Chrysanthemum (12 June 1980; posthumous)
Golden Pheasant Award of the Scout Association of Japan (1980)
In Mexico City, Mexico, a park was named after him; it is located south of Rio Churubusco avenue and East of Tlalpan avenue.

Foreign honours
: Order of Leopold (20 January 1964)
: Honorary Grand Commander of the Order of the Defender of the Realm (S.M.N.) (1964)
: Order of the Southern Cross (16 September 1976)

See also
 Christianity in Japan

Notes

References

Bibliography
Brown, James Robert. (1999). The ministry of finance: bureaucratic practices and the transformation of the Japanese economy. Westport, Connecticut: Greenwood Publishing. ; OCLC 39033542
Satō, Seizaburō Ken'ichi Kōyama and Shunpei Kumon. (1990). [Postwar Politician: The Life of Former Prime Minister Masayoshi Ohira.] Tokyo: Kodansha. 

|-

|-

|-

|-

|-

|-

|-

|-

|-

1910 births
1980 deaths
20th-century Japanese politicians
20th-century prime ministers of Japan
Foreign ministers of Japan
Ministers of Finance of Japan
Government ministers of Japan
Hitotsubashi University alumni
Japanese Christians
Japanese Anglicans
Liberal Democratic Party (Japan) politicians
Members of the House of Representatives (Japan)
Prime Ministers of Japan
Converts to Christianity
Politicians from Kagawa Prefecture